Senator Gregorio may refer to:

Arlen F. Gregorio (born 1931), California State Senate
John T. Gregorio (1928–2013), New Jersey State Senate

See also
Senator Gregory (disambiguation)